Kenexa, an IBM Company, provides employment and retention services.  This includes recruitment process outsourcing onboarding tools, employee assessment,  abilities assessment for employment candidates (Kenexa Prove It); and Kenexa Interview Builder, a structured interview archive with example questions.

History
In 1986, Kenexa began by providing recruitment services. Within its first decade, the firm created its first automated recruiting management system, and provided  employee research and employee performance management .

By 1998, the company had purchased fifteen organizations, and offered on-demand human capital management services. During the next three years, they acquired four additional companies and were able to offer employee screening, behavioral assessment and skills testing products.

In 2005, the company realized its initial public offering followed by the acquisition of BrassRing LLC, Gantz Wiley Research, Knowledge Workers Inc., Psychometric Services and Webhire, which preceded the purchase of HRC Human Resources Consulting GmbH and StraightSource in 2007, which expanded their business in Europe.

From 2008 to 2009, the company expanded to 30 offices in Asia, Europe, the Middle East and North America.  It took control of Quorum International Search Limited, and, in 2010, the Centre for High Performance Development and Salary.com.

On August 27, 2012, it was announced that Kenexa had been acquired by IBM for $1.3 billion. The acquisition was closed on December 4, 2012, and Kenexa became known as "Kenexa, an IBM Company" with approximately 2,800 Kenexa employees in 21 countries joining IBM.

The assets of Kenexa/ Brassring has recently been sold to Infinite Computer Solutions to Acquire IBM Talent Acquisition Suite SaaS Products Including BrassRing™ on Cloud on April 15, 2021

Divisions 
Brassring LLC, Founded in 1999 in Waltham, MA, is a provider of candidate searching, hiring strategy, skills management and outsourcing software applications.

The Centre for  Performance Development, founded in 1996 in London, England, is a management training company that offers human resources consultancy, leadership development and management training.

The company was responsible for creating the WorkTrends database of employee survey results, which looked at subjects such as customer relations, employee engagement, and leadership.

Knowledge Workers, Inc. of Englewood, Colorado, founded in 1985, supplies technology assistance and human resource consulting  government agencies.

 Salary.com, Inc.,  in Waltham, Massachusetts, is a compensation and human resource management services company, primarily in the U.S. human capital software as a service (SaaS) market.  The company's services are used by compensation professionals for talent management processes.

Awards
 Top Five Global Recruitment Process Outsourcing (RPO) Vendor (Baker's Dozen Customer Satisfaction Ratings 2010)
 10th on Forbes Fastest Growing Technology Companies, 2008
 Human Resources Magazine, Top Product of the Year, 2008, 2010
 Ranked the #1 most popular Talent Management Solution in 2012 and 2013 with 9,000 customers and 30 million users.

See also
List of talent management system companies

References

Companies formerly listed on the New York Stock Exchange
Companies based in Philadelphia
American companies established in 1987
1987 establishments in Pennsylvania
E-recruitment
IBM acquisitions
IBM subsidiaries
2012 mergers and acquisitions